No Time to Be Young is a 1957 American crime film noir directed by David Lowell Rich and starring Robert Vaughn.

Plot
The story follows the troubled lives of three young robbers. The first is a college dropout, and draft dodger, who plans to rob a supermarket so he can purchase a boat and escape his problems. The second is an indebted man who is responsible for the high medical bills of a con woman who hurt herself while on a date with him. The third is a pathological liar who cannot cope with his failed marriage and writing career. During the robbery, the dropout gets too wired and kills the manager. They flee, but the dropout's cohorts are captured by the cops while he steals a truck and heads screaming down the road for Mexico. A chase ensues until the truck's brakes fail and he suffers a fiery crash.

Cast
 Robert Vaughn as Buddy Root
 Roger Smith as Bob Miller
 Tom Pittman as Stu Bradley
 Dorothy Green as Mrs. Doris Dexter
 Merry Anders as Gloria Stuben
 Kathy Nolan as Tina Parner Bradley
 Sarah Selby as Mrs. Helen Root

Release
No Time to Be Young was released in theatres in August 1957. The film was released on DVD on March 4, 2011.

References

Sources

External links

1957 films
Films directed by David Lowell Rich
Columbia Pictures films
1957 directorial debut films
1950s English-language films